Isabell "Isi" Gabsa (born 7 June 1995) is a German professional golfer who currently plays on the LPGA Tour.

Amateur career
Gabsa was member of the National Team and represented Germany at the European Girls' Team Championship in 2011 and 2012, where her team finished 4th and 6th respectively.

Professional career
Gabsa turned professional after she qualified for the LET in December 2012, at seventeen the youngest German player at the time to do so. She struggled on the LET but had better success in LET Access Series events, and finished runner up at the 2013 Azores Ladies Open and solo third at the 2014 HLR Golf Academy Open in Finland.

In May 2015 Gabsa won the PGA Halmstad Ladies Open at Haverdal in Sweden and the Drøbak Ladies Open in Norway back to back, and ended the season 3rd in the 2015 LET Access Series Order of Merit, which earned her membership for the 2016 Ladies European Tour. 

In 2016 Gabsa also joined the Symetra Tour, and divided her time between it and the LET in 2016 and 2017. In 2018 she concentrated on the Symetra Tour where she won the Forsyth Classic, which helped her finish 9th on the Money list at the end of the season to gain a fully exempt card on the LPGA Tour for the 2019 season.

Professional wins (3)

Symetra Tour wins (1)

LET Access Series wins (2)

Team appearances
Amateur
European Girls' Team Championship  (representing Germany): 2011, 2012
Professional
European Championships (representing Germany): 2018

References

External links

German female golfers
LPGA Tour golfers
Ladies European Tour golfers
People from Munich
1995 births
Living people
21st-century German women